Marcinkowski (feminine Marcinkowska) is a Polish toponymic surname, denoting a person from the village of Marcinkowo or Marcinkowice. Notable people include:

 Andrzej Marcinkowski (1929-2010), Polish politician
 Dariusz Marcinkowski (born 1975), Polish field hockey player
 Ireneusz Marcinkowski (born 1977), Polish footballer
 JT Marcinkowski (born 1997), American professional soccer goalkeeper
 James Marcinkowski (born 1955), American CIA officer
 Karol Marcinkowski (1800-1846), Polish physician
 Renata Marcinkowska (born 1965), Polish tennis player
 Władysław Marcinkowski (1858-1947), Polish sculptor

Polish-language surnames
Toponymic surnames